Sreeja Akula (born 31 July 1998) is an Indian table tennis player. She is the reigning national champion in Women's singles and doubles tennis, having won them at the 83rd Senior National and Inter-State Table Tennis Championships, held in April 2022. She was the runner-up in national Women's singles in the previous edition, losing to Manika Batra. She was also a part of the Indian team at the 2022 Commonwealth Games where she won gold medal in mixed doubles event with Sharath Kamal. She was the gold medalist in Women's Doubles and Women's Team events in Table tennis at the 2019 South Asian Games.

References

1998 births
Living people
Indian female table tennis players
Racket sportspeople from Hyderabad, India
Sportswomen from Telangana
Table tennis players at the 2022 Commonwealth Games
Commonwealth Games gold medallists for India
Commonwealth Games medallists in table tennis
South Asian Games gold medalists for India
South Asian Games medalists in table tennis
21st-century Indian women
21st-century Indian people
20th-century Indian women
Recipients of the Arjuna Award
Medallists at the 2022 Commonwealth Games